Dissipation function may refer to

 Rayleigh's dissipation function
 Dissipation function under the fluctuation theorem